The 1993 Virginia lieutenant gubernatorial election was held on November 2, 1993. Democratic incumbent Don Beyer defeated Republican nominee Michael Farris with 54.49% of the vote.

General election

Candidates
Don Beyer, Democratic, Incumbent
Michael Farris, Republican, Attorney

Results

References

Virginia
1993
Lieutenant